Space Mafia may refer to:

 Space Mafia, a faction in the Metal Hero Series installment Blue SWAT
 Among Us, a 2018 social deduction video game